Eagle Swamp is a  long 3rd order tributary to Contentnea Creek in Lenoir County, North Carolina.

Course
Eagle Swamp rises in Hugo, North Carolina and then flows southeast to join Contentnea Creek at Tick Bite.

Watershed
Eagle Swamp drains  of area, receives about 49.9 in/year of precipitation, has a wetness index of 595.43, and is about 15% forested.

References

Rivers of North Carolina
Rivers of Lenoir County, North Carolina